The Torre de Cristal (Spanish for Glass Tower) is a skyscraper in the Cuatro Torres Business Area (CTBA) in Madrid, Spain, completed in 2008.

It was designed by Cesar Pelli and built by Dragados.

See also
List of tallest buildings in Spain
List of tallest buildings in the European Union
Torre Espacio
Cuatro Torres Business Area
Torre PwC
Torre Cepsa

References

External links
 

Office buildings completed in 2008
Skyscraper office buildings in Madrid
Modernist architecture in Madrid
César Pelli buildings
Buildings and structures in Fuencarral-El Pardo District, Madrid